Artocarpus treculianus is a species of plant in the family Moraceae. It is endemic to the Philippines.  It is threatened by habitat loss. Local names include chipuho and tipuho.

See also
 Domesticated plants and animals of Austronesia

References

Flora of the Philippines
treculianus
Vulnerable plants
Taxonomy articles created by Polbot